Poling may refer to:

 Poling (piezoelectricity), applying a strong electric field across piezoelectric materials
 Poling (horse), in equestrianism, hitting a horse on the legs to encourage it to clear a jump
 Poling System, rating system used to select college football national championship teams from 1924 to 1984
 Poling (metallurgy), a method for purification of copper in metallurgy
 Poling, a procedure used to shunt cars on a railway

Places 
 Poling, West Sussex, England
 Poling, Indiana, U.S.
 Poling, West Virginia, U.S.
 Poling Preceptory, a priory in West Sussex, England

People named Poling 

 Al Poling aka 911 (born 1957), American wrestler
 Chan Poling (Chandler Hall Poling, born 1957), American musician
 Clark V. Poling (1910–1943), Reverend and American war hero
 Daniel A. Poling (1884–1968), American clergyman
 Daniel Poling (born 1954), American politician
 Eleanor Poling, an American radio personality, television host, and actress
 Harold Arthur Poling (1925–2012), U.S. automobile businessman
 Jon Poling (born 1971), American neurologist
 Mary Poling (born 1946), American politician
 Samantha Poling, Scottish investigative journalist

See also 
Polling (disambiguation)
Pole (disambiguation)